Harry Charles Katz (born March 11, 1951) is an American university professor and academic administrator. He is the Jack Sheinkman Professor of Collective Bargaining at the Cornell University School of Industrial and Labor Relations.  From November 14, 2014, to July 31, 2015, he served as the interim Provost of Cornell University.

Katz was born in The Bronx, New York, and grew up in Northern California. He received an A.B. (1973) and Ph.D. (1977) in Economics from the University of California, Berkeley, after which he taught at MIT until 1985. He then went to Cornell, was appointed the Kenneth F. Kahn Dean of the Cornell University School of Industrial and Labor Relations in 2005, and became the interim Provost in 2014.

His research focuses on new structures for labor-management relationships in the United States, and his work argues the need for a more cooperative system. He is an expert on labor relations in the automobile and telecommunications industries both in the U.S. and abroad, and is often invited to lecture about those industries and about current labor-management relationships in general.

Katz is the author of several books, including Shifting Gears: Changing Labor Relations in the U.S. Automobile Industry, The Transformation of American Industrial Relations, Converging Divergences: Worldwide Changes in Employment Systems, and the widely used textbook An Introduction to Collective Bargaining and Industrial Relations.

In 2012, Katz was named a Scholar Fellow by the Labor and Employment Relations Association. He is the current president of the International Labor and Employment Relations Association

References

External links
ILR Dean's page

Living people
Cornell University School of Industrial and Labor Relations faculty
University of California, Berkeley alumni
MIT Sloan School of Management faculty
1951 births